Eric Brian Hughes also known as E.B. Hughes, is an American writer, director and producer. He has written, produced and directed three feature films, Turnabout (2016)  Exit 0 (2019), and The Long Way Back (2020). His screenplay The Fallen Faithful won Best Screenplay at the 2011 Beverly Hills Film Festival.

Background 
Hughes grew up in Ocean City, New Jersey, USA. He attended film school at Temple University in Philadelphia and Columbia College in Hollywood. From 1985-1997, Hughes was a photographer for Ring Magazine.

Career
Hughes' feature film Turnabout (2016) won awards at the Miami International Film Festival and the Philadelphia Independent Film Festival. 
 His screenplay Life's Back Pocket (1991) was a finalist in the Nicholl Fellowships in Screenwriting. His award-winning film  Exit 0  was released by Breaking Glass Pictures in March 2020. His most recent film  The Long Way Back  was released on May 11, 2021 by Breaking Glass Pictures.

Filmography

Feature films

Short films

References

External links 

https://screencomment.com/2021/05/longwayback-movie/
http://www.capemay.com/blog/2018/02/behind-scenes-upcoming-thriller-exit-0/
https://www.spreaker.com/user/impossiblefunky/ep371-scarecrow
https://www.ukfilmreview.co.uk/blog/exit-0-indie-film-review
https://screencritix.com/exit-0-2019-review/
http://www.searchmytrash.com/articles/ebhughes(2-20).shtml
https://filmthreat.com/uncategorized/eb-hughes-waiting-for-the-bell/
https://patch.com/new-jersey/oceancity/ocean-city-directors-movie-makes-garden-state-film-festival 
https://filmthreat.com/uncategorized/harsh-light/

Living people
Film directors from New Jersey
American male screenwriters
Film producers from New Jersey
People from Ocean City, New Jersey
20th-century American writers
21st-century American writers
20th-century American male writers
1975 births
Screenwriters from New Jersey